Walter L. Budko Jr. (July 30, 1925 – May 25, 2013) was an American professional basketball player.

He played collegiately for Columbia University.

He was selected by the Baltimore Bullets with the sixth overall pick of the 1948 BAA draft. He played for the Bullets (1948–51) and Philadelphia Warriors (1951–52) in the BAA and NBA for 253 games. He coached the Bullets in the NBA (1950–51).

BAA/NBA career statistics

Regular season

Playoffs

External links

Death Notice

1925 births
2013 deaths
All-American college men's basketball players
Basketball coaches from New York (state)
Baltimore Bullets (1944–1954) draft picks
Baltimore Bullets (1944–1954) head coaches
Baltimore Bullets (1944–1954) players
Basketball players from New York City
Centers (basketball)
Columbia Lions men's basketball players
Philadelphia Warriors players
Player-coaches
Power forwards (basketball)
Sportspeople from Brooklyn
American men's basketball players